The Somalia Petroleum Corporation (SPC), also known as the Somalia Petroleum Company, is a hydrocarbon exploration and production firm based in Mogadishu, Somalia. It was established in 2007, following the passing of the Somalia Petroleum Law by the Transitional Federal Government. The Somalia Petroleum Corporation is owned by the Federal Government of Somalia, and falls under the authority of the national Ministry of Natural Resources.

See also
List of companies of Somalia

References

Oil companies of Somalia
Companies based in Mogadishu